The 2013 World's Strongest Man was the 36th edition of World's Strongest Man. The event was held in Haitang Bay, Sanya, China, the same host city as the 2006 World's Strongest Man contest. The qualifying heats were held from August 17–20 and the finals on Aug. 23 & 24. The event was sponsored by the Commerce Casino and will be broadcast in the United States on the CBS Sports Network. Brian Shaw from the United States placed first, winning his second WSM title after winning in 2011. Zydrunas Savickas from Lithuania was second after finishing 1st the year before, and Hafþór Júlíus Björnsson from Iceland was third for the second year in a row.

Line-up

Qualified athletes

Qualifying Heats

Heat 1

Heat 2

Heat 3

Heat 4

Heat 5

Finals

References

External links
 Official site

2013 in Chinese sport
World's Strongest Man